The following is a list of pipeline accidents in the United States in 2010. It is one of several lists of U.S. pipeline accidents. See also list of natural gas and oil production accidents in the United States.

Incidents 

This is not a complete list of all pipeline accidents. For natural gas alone, the Pipeline and Hazardous Materials Safety Administration (PHMSA), a United States Department of Transportation agency, has collected data on more than 3,200 accidents deemed serious or significant since 1987.

A "significant incident" results in any of the following consequences:
 fatality or injury requiring in-patient hospitalization
 $50,000 or more in total costs, measured in 1984 dollars
 liquid releases of five or more barrels (42 US gal/barrel)
 releases resulting in an unintentional fire or explosion

PHMSA and the National Transportation Safety Board (NTSB) post incident data and results of investigations into accidents involving pipelines that carry a variety of products, including natural gas, oil, diesel fuel, gasoline, kerosene, jet fuel, carbon dioxide, and other substances. Occasionally pipelines are repurposed to carry different products.

 On January 2, Enbridge's Line 2 ruptured near Neche, North Dakota, releasing about 3,784 barrels of crude oil, of which 2,237 barrels were recovered. The cause was a material defect.
 On January 7, a gas pipeline exploded near Barksdale Air Force Base, Louisiana, killing a pipeline employee.
 On February 1, a plumber trying to unclog a sewer line in St. Paul, Minnesota ruptured a gas service line that has been "cross bored" through the house's sewer line. The plumber and resident escaped the house moments before as an explosion and following fire destroyed the house. The Minnesota Office of Pipeline Safety ordered that gas utility, Xcel, to check for more cross bored gas lines. In the following year, 25,000 sewer lines inspected showed 57 other cross bored gas lines. The NTSB had cited such cross bore incidents as a known hazard since 1976.
 On February 7, a power plant explosion occurred at the Kleen Energy Systems, killing 5 and injuring a dozen.
There was no fire.
 On March 1, at about 8:10 am, Mid-Valley Pipeline identified a release of crude oil in the manifold area of the Mid-Valley tank farm in Longview, Texas. Crude oil was observed "gushing" from the soil in the manifold area. About 198 barrels of crude oil were estimated to have been released and 196 barrels were recovered from the secondary containment area within Mid-Valley's site.
 On March 2, 2010, Reno County 911 dispatch was notified about a natural gas leak in a 26-inch diameter interstate pipeline at Red Rock Road and Andre Road near Abbyville, Kansas. Twenty people were evacuated as a precaution. The leak was caused by a ruptured girth weld in the pipe owned by Southern Star Central Gas Pipeline. The pipe was manufactured in 1967. 
 On March 15, a 24-inch gas pipeline burst, but did not ignite near Pampa, Texas.
 On March 25, there was a release of 1700 barrels of Vacuum gas oil (VGO) from the FM-1 pipeline into an open in-ground valve pit and the surrounding area in the West Yard of the Sunoco, R&M Philadelphia refinery in Philadelphia, Pennsylvania. The area was under the control of the Operator in a fenced off area that is off-limits to the public.
 On April 5, a crude oil pipeline ruptured near Green River, Wyoming. At least  of crude were spilled. Corrosion in the pipeline was the cause.
 On April 13, a flash fire occurred as a result of incorrect operations while operator and contract employees were conducting planned maintenance at the Seymour Terminal of the Enterprise Products Operating Company, LLC(EPCO) located in Jackson County, Indiana. Two EPCO employees and two contract employees were injured.
 On April 14, 2010, at an Enogex natural gas compressor station in Bennington, Oklahoma, during construction tie-ins related to an expansion project, a contract employee was injured as a result of a flash fire which immediately extinguished itself. The contract employee's injuries required in-patient hospitalization. The cause of the accident was, in part, miscommunication between two crews working in the station at the same time.
 On April 23, a pipeline ruptured near Niles, Kansas, due to previous excavation damage. About 1,659 barrels of natural gasoline were lost.
 On May 10, 2010, at Swifton, Arkansas, a Mississippi River Transmission Corporation employee arrived at the Swifton M&R station and found the regulator engulfed in flames, evidently from a direct hit by a lightning strike which perforated the equipment.
 On May 29, an Amoco pipeline leaked nearly 89,000 gallons of gasoline into a farm field along Quarterline Road. The leak occurred in Constantine Township, St. Joseph County, Michigan. The cause was from a manufacturing defect in the pipe.
 On June 7, a 36-inch Enterprise natural gas pipeline leaked, exploded and started a fire in Johnson County, Texas when it was disturbed by workers installing poles for electrical lines. The mapping of subsurface utilities was inadequate, leading to inaccurate maps. Confusion over the location and status of the construction work led to the pipeline not being marked beforehand. These inaccuracies led to a miscommunication between the locator and the excavator, As a result, one worker was killed and seven were injured. The pipe was manufactured and installed in 1970.
 On June 8, construction workers hit an unmarked 14-inch gas gathering pipeline near Darrouzett, Texas. Two workers were killed, and 3 others injured.
 The Red Butte Creek oil spill. On June 12, a Chevron crude oil pipeline was damaged by lightning and ruptured, causing  of crude to spill into Red Butte Creek in Salt Lake City, Utah. Crude then flowed into a pond in Liberty Park.
 On July 5, a landowner operating a bulldozer hit an 8-inch LPG/propane pipeline near Thomson, Georgia. Later, the propane fumes ignited, killing the adult son of the landowner, and igniting fires that destroyed a trailer house and woodlands.
 On July 26, the Kalamazoo River oil spill: Enbridge Energy Partners LLP (Enbridge), reported that a  pipeline belonging to Enbridge burst in Marshall, Michigan. Enbridge had numerous alarms from the affected Line 6B, but controllers thought the alarms were from phase separation, and the leak was not reported to Enbridge for 17 hours. On July 27, 2010, an Administrative Order was issued by U.S. EPA requiring the performance of removal actions in connection with the facility. The Order requires Enbridge to immediately conduct removal of a discharge or to mitigate or prevent a substantial threat of a discharge of oil and to submit a Work Plan for the cleanup activities that was to include a Health and Safety Plan, as required by 29 CFR 1910.120 (HAZWOPER). In 2012, the NTSB later cited known but unrepaired cracks and external corrosion as the cause.
 On August 10, the U.S. Environmental Protection Agency (EPA) and the Justice Department announced that Plains All American Pipeline and several of its operating subsidiaries have agreed to spend approximately $41 million to upgrade  of crude oil pipeline operated in the United States. The settlement resolves Plains' Clean Water Act violations for ten crude oil spills in Texas, Louisiana, Oklahoma, and Kansas, and requires the company to pay a $3.25 million civil penalty.
 On August 17, smell from a mixture of gasoline and diesel fuel were detected in Hammond, Indiana. The source was from a leaking Amoco/BP pipeline in the area, and about 38,000 gallons of the mixture was released. About 5,000 gallons of the spillage was not recovered. The cause was external corrosion to the pipeline.
 On August 24, a gas compressor station explosion in Shongaloo, Louisiana injured one worker.
 On August 25, a construction crew installing a gas pipeline in Roberts County, Texas hit an unmarked pipeline, seriously burning one man.
 On August 27, an LPG pipeline leaked in Gilboa, New York, forcing the evacuation of 23 people. The cause was stress corrosion cracking. There were no injuries or ignition.
 On September 9, 2010 a 30-inch diameter high pressure natural gas pipeline exploded in San Bruno, California, a suburb of San Francisco. The blast destroyed 38 homes and damaged 120 more. More than a hundred people were evacuated. Eight died and at least 50 were injured. Ten acres of brush also burned. Later, PG&E was unable to supply the California Public Utilities Commission with documents on how PG&E established pressure limits on some of its gas transmission pipelines. It was also revealed that this pipeline had 26 leaks between Milpitas and San Francisco during the time of 1951 to 2009, with some of the leak causes listed in records as "unknown". Later hydrostatic testing of the pipeline that failed found a pinhole leak, and a previously damaged section blew out. The pipe was manufactured in 1949. 
 On September 9, a 20-inch diameter Columbia Gas Transmission Company pipeline failed in Lawrence County, Kentucky. While there was no fire or evacuations, the condition of this uncoated, non-cathodic protected, unknown grade pipeline caused PHMSA to enter into a Consent Order to eventually replace this pipeline.
 On September 28, a repair crew was working on a corroded gas pipe in Cairo, Georgia, when the line exploded. One crew member was killed, and three others burned.
 On October 11, equipment failure on Centurion Pipeline caused it to fail in Levelland, Texas, releasing about 428,000 gallons of crude oil.
 On October 15, a natural gas pipeline under construction in Grand Prairie, Texas was running a cleaning pig without a pig "trap" at the end of the pipe. The 150 pound pig was expelled from the pipeline with enough force to fly , and crash through the side of a house. No one was injured.
 On November 8, 2010, near Tioga, North Dakota, Aevenia Energy contracted to plow electrical cables underground from an oil well location owned by Amerada Hess Corporation across a wheat field to a power pole. The crew consisted of two bulldozer operators and one employee walking near the plow. Plowing started at the oil well location and had gone about 260 feet when it struck a Williston Basin Interstate Pipeline Company natural gas transmission line. The 8-inch diameter pipeline, operating at approximately 650 psig, failed after being struck by the plow, killing the person who was standing on the ground near the rupture. The two bulldozer operators jumped off their equipment and ran from the escaping gas. The force of the jetting gas blew the person on the ground 80 feet. None of the parties made a one-call notification prior to the start of the project. Two pipeline marker posts were visible from the access road into the site; the closest about 517 feet south of the rupture.
 On November 12, three men working on natural gas lines were injured when a pipeline ruptured in Monroe, Louisiana.
 On November 30, a Tennessee Gas Pipeline 30-inch diameter gas pipeline failed at Natchitoches, Louisiana. There was no fire, but the pipe, which was manufactured in 1948, had a Magnetic Flux smart pig test earlier in the year that indicated no flaws. The failure was at a crack in a wrinkle bend which may have been stressed by shifting soil. The deadly 1965 gas pipeline accident had occurred on a different pipeline owned by the same company nearby.
This failure was only 100 yards from a June 2010 failure on the same pipeline.
 On December 2, a pipeline was discovered leaking gasoline near Livingston, Illinois.
 On December 8, at East Bernard, Texas, a 24-inch diameter Tennessee Gas Pipeline exploded, blasting a 12-foot section of ruptured pipe 295 feet and caused $715,000 in property damage. It took 6 hours for the pipe system to blow down. The cause of the leak was a full guillotine failure of the pipe caused by internal corrosion micro-biologically induced due to moisture in the pipe. The pipe was manufactured in 1948.
 On December 17, a gas line fire and explosion just outside Corpus Christi, Texas city limits left one person critically injured. A man was working on removing an abandoned pipeline when it exploded, and his face was severely burned.
 On December 21, a crude oil pipeline was discovered leaking into the Dominguez Channel in the Port of Los Angeles. Over 1,000 gallons of crude oil was recovered, but the pipeline company was alleged to have failed to report the spill to State or Federal pipeline authorities. A 61 count criminal complaint was later filed in this accident.
 On December 24, 2010, a mechanical failure at a Texas Gas Transmission compressor station near Youngsville, Louisiana, caused a gas leak that ignited and exploded in the middle of the night. The Texas Gas gas control center received alarms indicating fire, vibration, and emergency shutdown alarms were activated. The fire department and state police secured the site. Once cleared by the fire chief on site, Texas Gas personnel assessed the damage. The cause of the incident was compressor component malfunction. The metallurgical report determined that six of eight engine bolts failed due to high cycle fatigue. The equipment has been installed in 1965.
 On December 28, a pipeline at an underground gas storage facility in Covington County, Mississippi leaked, forcing the evacuation of about two dozen families for over a week.

References 

Lists of pipeline accidents in the United States
2010 disasters in the United States